Mother Wore Tights is a 1947 Technicolor musical film starring Betty Grable and Dan Dailey as married vaudeville performers, directed by Walter Lang.

This was Grable and Dailey's first film together, based on a book of the same name by Miriam Young. It was the highest grossing film of Grable's career up to this time, earning more than $5 million at the box office. It was also 20th Century Fox's most successful film of 1947.

Alfred Newman won the Academy Award for Best Music, Scoring of a Musical Picture. Josef Myrow (music) and Mack Gordon (lyrics) were nominated for Original Song ("You Do"), while Harry Jackson was nominated for Color Cinematography.

Plot
In turn-of-the-century Oakland, California, the teenaged Myrtle McKinley (Betty Grable) is expected to follow high school by attending a San Francisco business college. Instead, she takes a job performing with a traveling vaudeville troupe, where she meets and falls in love with singer-dancer Frank Burt (Dan Dailey).

Frank proposes they marry and also entertain on stage together as an act, which proves very popular. Myrtle retires from show business after giving birth to daughters Iris (Mona Freeman) and Mikie (Connie Marshall), while her husband goes on tour with another partner.

A few years later, less successful now, Frank persuades his wife to return to the stage. The girls are cared for by their grandmother as their parents leave town for months at a time.

Iris and Mikie are school girls when they are given a trip to Boston to see their parents. Iris meets a well-to-do young man, Bob Clarkman (Robert Arthur), and is permitted to attend an exclusive boarding school there. She is embarrassed by her parents' profession, however, and mortified at what the reaction will be from Bob and all of her new school friends when they learn that her parents are performing nearby.

Myrtle and Frank take matters into their own hands, arranging with the school to have all of the students attend a show. To her great relief, Iris is delighted when her classmates adore her parents' sophisticated act. By the time she's out of school and ready to marry, Iris wants to go into show business herself.

Cast

 Betty Grable as Myrtle McKinley Burt
 Dan Dailey as Frank Burt
 Mona Freeman as Iris Burt
 Connie Marshall as Miriam Burt
 Vanessa Brown as Bessie
 Robert Arthur as Bob Clarkman
 Sara Allgood as Grandmother McKinley
 William Frawley as Mr. Schneider
 Ruth Nelson as Miss Ridgeway
 Anabel Shaw as Alice Flemmerhammer 
 George Cleveland as Grandfather McKinley
 Veda Ann Borg as Rosemary Olcott
 Sig Ruman as Papa
 Lee Patrick as Lil
 Senor Wences as himself (with his ventriloquist character "Johnny")
 Anne Baxter as Narrator
 Chick Chandler as Ed
 Harry Cheshire as Minister
 Ruth Clifford as Resort Guest
 George Davis as Waiter
 Maude Eburne as Mrs. Muggins
 William Forrest as Mr. Clarkman
 Anne Kimbell as Iris's friend
 Kathleen Lockhart as Mrs. Clarkman
 Mae Marsh as Resort Guest
 Tom Moore as Man
 Frank Orth as Stage Doorman
 Lotte Stein as Mama
 Will Wright as Withers

Accolades
The film was nominated for the American Film Institute's 2006 list AFI's Greatest Movie Musicals.

References

External links
 
 
 
 

1947 films
20th Century Fox films
Films directed by Walter Lang
1947 musical films
Films that won the Best Original Score Academy Award
Films set in California
Films scored by Alfred Newman
Films with screenplays by Lamar Trotti
American musical films
1940s English-language films
1940s American films